Anolis peraccae is a species of lizard in the family Dactyloidae. The species is found in Ecuador and Colombia.

References

Anoles
Reptiles of Ecuador
Reptiles of Colombia
Reptiles described in 1898
Taxa named by George Albert Boulenger